Hans Hahn (27 September 1879 – 24 July 1934) was an Austrian mathematician and philosopher who made contributions to functional analysis, topology, set theory, the calculus of variations, real analysis, and order theory. In philosophy he was among the main logical positivists of the Vienna Circle.

Biography
Born in Vienna as the son of a higher government official of the K.K. Telegraphen-Korrespondenz Bureau (since 1946 named "Austria Presse Agentur"), in 1898 Hahn became a student at the Universität Wien starting with a study of law. In 1899 he switched over to mathematics and spent some time at the universities of Strasbourg, Munich and Göttingen. In 1902 he took his Ph.D. in Vienna, on the subject "Zur Theorie der zweiten Variation einfacher Integrale". He was a student of Gustav von Escherich.

He was appointed to the teaching staff (Habilitation) in Vienna in 1905. After 1905/1906 as a stand-in for Otto Stolz at Innsbruck and some further years as a Privatdozent in Vienna, he was nominated in 1909 Professor extraordinarius in Czernowitz, at that time a town within the empire of Austria. After joining the Austrian army in 1915, he was badly wounded in 1916 and became again Professor extraordinarius, now in Bonn. In 1917 he was nominated a regular Professor there and in 1921 he returned to Vienna with this title, where he stayed until his rather early death in 1934 at the age of 54, following cancer surgery.
He had married  Eleonore ("Lilly") Minor in 1909 and they had a daughter, Nora (born 1910).

He was also interested in philosophy, and was part of a discussion group concerning Mach's positivism with Otto Neurath (who had married Hahn’s sister Olga Hahn-Neurath in 1912), and Phillip Frank prior to the First World War.  In 1922, he helped arrange Moritz Schlick's entry into the group, which led to the founding of the Vienna Circle, the group that was at the center of logical positivist thought in the 1920s.  His most famous student was Kurt Gödel, whose Ph.D. thesis was completed in 1929. After Anschluss the fact that Hans Hahn had been of partial Jewish origin caused Gödel's difficulties with getting a position at the University of Vienna. Within the Vienna Circle, Hahn was also known (and controversial) for using his mathematical and philosophical work to study psychic phenomena; according to Karl Menger he sometimes openly advocated further research into extrasensory perception while lecturing. Politically Hahn was a socialist and was chairman of the Association of Socialist University Teachers.

Hahn's contributions to mathematics include the Hahn–Banach theorem and (independently of Banach and Steinhaus) the uniform boundedness principle. Other theorems include:

 the Hahn decomposition theorem;
 the Hahn embedding theorem;
 the Hahn–Kolmogorov theorem;
 the Hahn–Mazurkiewicz theorem;
 the Vitali–Hahn–Saks theorem.

Hahn authored the book : according to Arthur Rosenthal, "... (it) formed a great advance in the Theory of Real functions and had a great influence on the further development of this theory". He was also a co-author of the book Set Functions, published in 1948 by Arthur Rosenthal, fourteen years after his death in Vienna in 1934.

In 1921 he received the Richard Lieben Prize. In 1926 he was the president of the German Mathematical Society. In 1928 he was an Invited Speaker at the International Congress of Mathematicians in Bologna.

Publications

 (freely available at the Internet Archive).

.
.

See also
Domain (mathematical analysis)
Mathematical analysis

Notes

External links 
 
 

1879 births
1934 deaths
Austrian Jews
Scientists from Vienna
20th-century Austrian mathematicians
Vienna Circle
Topologists
Set theorists
Austrian agnostics
Austrian socialists
Jewish agnostics
Jewish scientists
Austro-Hungarian mathematicians
Academic staff of Chernivtsi University
Functional analysts